Hugh Kenny is a former Irish Gaelic footballer from Baltinglass in County Wicklow. Kenny was part of the Baltinglass team that dominated Wicklow football in the 1980s and 1990s, winning an All-Ireland Senior Club Football Championship Title in 1990. He also managed the Wicklow from 2003 to 2006 but resigned following heavy defeat to Carlow. He also played Full Back on the Wicklow team that beat Kerry in the 2002 All-Ireland Junior Football Championship.

He was Kilmacud Crokes senior football manager from 2012 to 2013.

Hugh Kenny has been the Wicklow GAA games development manager since 1997.

References

Year of birth missing (living people)
Living people
Baltinglass footballers
Gaelic football managers
Wicklow inter-county Gaelic footballers